NFR may refer to:

National Film Registry, US
Norman Fucking Rockwell, a Lana Del Rey album, a.k.a. NFR!, 2019
National Finals Rodeo, US
Network flight recorder, a software intrusion detection system
New Republican Force, Bolivian political party
"Not for resuscitation", alternative wording to "Do not resuscitate" in medical records
Non-filterable residue, equivalent to total suspended solids
nfr or nefer, an ancient Egyptian hieroglyph
Nociceptive flexion reflex, a muscle withdrawal reflex
Non-functional requirement
Non-financial risk
NFR (Northeast Frontier Railway zone), one of the 17 railway zones in India
 NFR Norges forskningsråd, The Research Council of Norway, RCN in English